Andrew William Sanchez (born April 8, 1988) is an American professional mixed martial artist currently competing in the Middleweight division. A professional competitor since 2012, he has formerly competed for the Ultimate Fighting Championship (UFC) and Resurrection Fighting Alliance.

Background
Sanchez started training in various forms of martial arts as a teenager. He was a two-time national championship wrestler at McKendree University and was named the 2011 NAIA Wrestler of the Year. He graduated in 2011 with a degree in Sociology.

Mixed martial arts career
Sanchez began fighting professionally in 2012 where he compiled a record of 7–2 on the regional circuit.

The Ultimate Fighter
He was added as one of the 16 Light Heavyweight fighters invited to the cast The Ultimate Fighter 23.

He won his entry fight against Phil Hawes via unanimous decision. Next up, he defeated Myron Dennis via unanimous decision.

In the semifinals, he defeated Eric Spicely by knockout in the first round.

Ultimate Fighting Championship
Sanchez made his promotional debut on July 8, 2016 at UFC The Ultimate Fighter 23 Finale in the Light Heavyweight finals against Khalil Rountree. He won the one-sided fight via unanimous decision with the score card of (30-25, 30–25, 30–26).

Sanchez next faced Trevor Smith in a middleweight bout on December 9, 2016 at UFC Fight Night 102. He won the fight by unanimous decision.

Sanchez faced Anthony Smith on April 15, 2017 at UFC on Fox 24. He lost the fight via knockout due to a combination of knee and punches in the third round.

Sanchez faced Ryan Janes on December 1, 2017 at The Ultimate Fighter 26 Finale. He lost the fight via TKO in the third round.

Sanchez was expected to face Antonio Braga Neto on August 25, 2018 at UFC Fight Night 135. However, Neto was removed from the bout on August 2 for undisclosed personal issues and replaced by Markus Perez. Sanchez won the fight via unanimous decision.

Sanchez faced promotional newcomer Marc-André Barriault on May 4, 2019 at UFC Fight Night 151. He won the fight via unanimous decision.

Sanchez was scheduled to face David Branch on September 14, 2019 at UFC on ESPN+ 16. However, it was reported that Branch was forced to pull from the event due to injury and he was replaced by Marvin Vettori. However, it was reported that Sanchez was forced to pull from the event due to an eye infection, resulting in the cancellation of the bout. In turn, the pairing was left intact and eventually took place a month later at UFC on ESPN+ 19. Sanchez lost the fight via unanimous decision.

Sanchez was scheduled to face Zak Cummings on April 25, 2020.  Due to the COVID-19 pandemic, UFC president Dana White announced on April 9 that the event was indefinitely postponed.

Sanchez faced Wellington Turman on August 8, 2020 at UFC Fight Night 174. He won the fight via knockout in the first round. This win earned him the Performance of the Night award.

Sanchez was scheduled to face André Muniz on January 24, 2021 at UFC 257.  In late December, Muniz withdrew due to an injury and he was replaced by Makhmud Muradov. He lost the fight via technical knockout in round three.

Sanchez faced Bruno Silva on October 16, 2021 at UFC Fight Night 195. He lost the fight via technical knockout in round three.

On October 28, 2021 it was announced that Sanchez was no longer on the UFC roster.

Post UFC 
Sanchez faced Gabriel Checco on May 20, 2022 at Eagle FC 47. He won the fight via unanimous decision.

Championships and accomplishments

Professional titles
Ultimate Fighting Championship 
 Performance of the Night (One time)

Mixed martial arts record

|-
|Win
|align=center|13–7
|Gabriel Checco
|Decision (unanimous)
|Eagle FC 47
|
|align=center|3
|align=center|5:00
|Miami, Florida, United States
|
|-
|Loss
|align=center|12–7
|Bruno Silva
|TKO (punches)
|UFC Fight Night: Ladd vs. Dumont
|
|align=center|3
|align=center|2:35
|Las Vegas, Nevada, United States
|
|-
|Loss
|align=center|12–6
|Makhmud Muradov
|TKO (flying knee and punches)
|UFC 257 
|
|align=center|3
|align=center|2:59
|Abu Dhabi, United Arab Emirates
|  
|-
|Win
|align=center|12–5
|Wellington Turman
|KO (punch)
|UFC Fight Night: Lewis vs. Oleinik 
|
|align=center|1
|align=center|4:14
|Las Vegas, Nevada, United States
| 
|-
|Loss
|align=center|11–5
|Marvin Vettori
|Decision (unanimous)
|UFC Fight Night: Joanna vs. Waterson 
|
|align=center|3
|align=center|5:00
|Tampa, Florida, United States
|
|-
|Win
|align=center|11–4
|Marc-André Barriault
|Decision (unanimous)
|UFC Fight Night: Iaquinta vs. Cowboy 
|
|align=center|3
|align=center|5:00
|Ottawa, Ontario, Canada
|  
|-
|Win
|align=center|10–4
|Markus Perez
|Decision (unanimous)
|UFC Fight Night: Gaethje vs. Vick 
|
|align=center|3
|align=center|5:00
|Lincoln, Nebraska, United States
|
|-
|Loss
|align=center|9–4
|Ryan Janes
|TKO (punches)
|The Ultimate Fighter: A New World Champion Finale 
|
|align=center|3
|align=center|0:59
|Las Vegas, Nevada, United States
|
|-
|Loss
|align=center|9–3
|Anthony Smith
|KO (head kick and punches)
|UFC on Fox: Johnson vs. Reis
|
|align=center|3
|align=center|3:52
|Kansas City, Missouri, United States
|
|-
|Win
|align=center|9–2
|Trevor Smith
|Decision (unanimous)
|UFC Fight Night: Lewis vs. Abdurakhimov
|
|align=center|3
|align=center|5:00
|Albany, New York, United States
|
|-
|Win
|align=center|8–2
|Khalil Rountree
|Decision (unanimous)
|The Ultimate Fighter: Team Joanna vs. Team Cláudia Finale
|
|align=center|3
|align=center|5:00
|Las Vegas, Nevada, United States
|
|-
| Win
| align=center| 7–2
| John Poppie
| TKO (spinning back fist and punches)
| RFA 28
| 
| align=center| 3
| align=center| 1:53
|St. Louis, Missouri, United States
| 
|-
| Win
| align=center| 6–2
| Clinton Williams
| TKO (punches)
| RFA 26
| 
| align=center| 2
| align=center| 1:17
|Broomfield, Colorado, United States
| 
|-
| Loss
| align=center| 5–2
| Kevin Casey
| KO (punches)
| RFA 15
| 
| align=center| 1
| align=center| 2:30
|Los Angeles, California, United States
| 
|-
| Win
| align=center| 5–1
| Miles Marshall
| TKO (punches)
| RFA 13
| 
| align=center| 2
| align=center| 1:25
|Lincoln, Nebraska, United States
| 
|-
| Win
| align=center| 4–1
| Todd Meredith
| TKO (punches)
| RFA 11
| 
| align=center| 1
| align=center| 1:51
|Broomfield, Colorado, United States
| 
|-
| Loss
| align=center| 3–1
| Dustin Jacoby
| Decision (split)
| Capital City Cage Wars: The Uprising
| 
| align=center| 3
| align=center| 5:00
|Springfield, Illinois, United States
|
|-
| Win
| align=center| 3–0
| Thomas Jones
| TKO (punches)
| TTP: Tommy Tran Promotions
| 
| align=center| 1
| align=center| 2:57
|Branson, Missouri, United States
| 
|-
| Win
| align=center| 2–0
| Darryl Cobb
| Submission (rear-naked choke)
| FHMMA: Fight Hard MMA
| 
| align=center| 1
| align=center| 4:33
|St. Charles, Missouri, United States
| 
|-
| Win
| align=center| 1–0
| Edward Smith
| Submission (rear-naked choke)
| CC 38: Cage Championships 38
| 
| align=center| 1
| align=center| 1:42
|Sullivan, Missouri, United States
|

See also 
 List of male mixed martial artists

References

External links
 
 

1988 births
Living people
American male mixed martial artists
Light heavyweight mixed martial artists
Middleweight mixed martial artists
Mixed martial artists utilizing collegiate wrestling
Mixed martial artists from Illinois
McKendree University alumni
Ultimate Fighting Championship male fighters
American male sport wrestlers
Amateur wrestlers